Daniel Farhi (18 November 1941 – 23 August 2021) was a French liberal rabbi.

Biography
Farhi was born in Paris on 18 November 1941 to Samuel and Estréa Farhi, who were originally from İzmir, Turkey. During World War II, he was hidden with his sister, Françoise, by a Protestant family in Besançon, who were later honored as Righteous Among the Nations. He received Semikhah in February 1966 and became rabbi of the Union Libérale Israélite de France from 1967 to 1977, succeeding .

In 1981, he created the Jewish liberal newspaper Tenou'a. He strongly defended the idea that Halakha (Jewish law), must continue to be amended to keep up with societal changes so that the return of the Sanhedrin can be appropriately applied to modern times.

Farhi was active in dialogues with Christian and Muslim groups. He also worked to preserve the memory of the Holocaust and was a friend of Serge and Beate Klarsfeld. In 1975, he became an activist within the Sons and Daughters of Jewish Deportees from France and subsequently helped to organize eight pilgrimages to Auschwitz.

Farhi was the father of three children, including Rabbi . He died in Nice on 23 August 2021 at the age of 79.

Distinctions
Knight of the Ordre national du Mérite (1988)
Officer of the Legion of Honour (2012)

Publications

Prayer books
Siddour Taher Libénou
Mahzor Anénou

Essays
Parler aux enfants d’Israël
Un judaïsme dans le siècle (1997)
Au dernier survivant
Paroles sur la Shoah (2007)
Anthologie du judaisme libéral (2007)
Au dernier survivant (2008)

Interview books
Profession Rabbin (2006)

References

1941 births
2021 deaths
Clergy from Paris
French Reform rabbis
French writers
French people of Turkish-Jewish descent
Knights of the Ordre national du Mérite
Officiers of the Légion d'honneur